"What Can I Do" is a song by Irish band the Corrs, from their second and breakthrough album, Talk on Corners (1997). The song was originally released in January 1998, but its moderate charting success was limited, due to the time of the shooting of the video. The song was later re-released in August the same year in a remixed form by Tin Tin Out, which generated more attention, reaching number three in the United Kingdom. The song received generally favorable reviews from music critics, though some felt it was not as strong as their previous songs. An accompanying music video was released, which was shot in New Zealand during their world tour.

Background

The original version of the song, which appeared on the original release of Talk on Corners, is a slow doo-wop style song, which is much lighter. However, the Tin Tin Out remix, which later appeared on the album's special edition release, is more guitar riffed with the addition of orchestral strings in the latter half of the song performed by the Duke Quartet. The voice range is a chord of A major and spans from G3 to C5. The Corrs have regularly performed this song live in concert since the start of the Talk on Corners World Tour in November 1997, originally performing the album version, but later switching to the Tin Tin Out version on an on-off basis in May 1998, then permanently from September 1998 onwards.

Chart performance
Upon its release in January 1998, the song debuted at number 44 on the Swedish Singles Chart, until it rose to number 27, its peak. The song was then re-released a few months later, remixed by Tin Tin Out. The remix was even more successful than "Dreams" and managed to enter the top 3 on the UK Singles Chart, peaking at number three. It remained on the charts for 13 weeks.

Critical reception
"What Can I Do" received generally favourable reviews from music critics, although the group did not initially favour the track. Becky Byrkit from AllMusic praised the remix version, noting its "trademark glass voices and barely discernible acoustic musical instruments." She also highlighted the song as an album standout. Dave Karger from Entertainment Weekly called it a "sluggishly sweet tune" and added that the guitar riff is "a bit too reminiscent" of Edie Brickell's "What I Am" and the lyrics "shamelessly swiped" from Elton John's "Sorry Seems to Be the Hardest Word". A reviewer from Music Week felt the remix "lacks the warmth of the original, but Andrea Corr's vocals shine through the rather spartan sound and the chorus's hook remains as infectious as ever." Claudia Connell from News of the World remarked that "Corrs are one of the most played acts on Irish airwaves at the moment and this looks like being the hit single they desperately deserve. "What Can I Do" is more radio-friendly than anything else around and has to rocket the family band into the big league." Dave Fawbert from ShortList viewed it as a "absolutely brilliant song" and "really lovely slice of folky pop".

Track listings

Original release

 UK CD single
 "What Can I Do"
 "Little Wing"
 "No Good for Me" (live in Copenhagen, October 1997)

 UK cassette single and European CD single
 "What Can I Do" – 4:18
 "No Good for Me" (live in Copenhagen, October 1997) – 3:54

Remixes

 UK CD1
 "What Can I Do" (Tin Tin Out remix) – 4:12
 "What Can I Do" (Stringappella) – 2:28
 "Paddy McCarthy" – 4:59

 UK CD2 
 "What Can I Do" (live) – 4:29
 "Runaway" (live) – 4:26
 "Toss the Feathers" (live) – 3:53

 Australian CD single
 "What Can I Do" (Tin Tin Out remix) – 4:12
 "What Can I Do" (LP version) – 4:12
 "Dreams" (Tees radio) – 3:53

 US CD, 7-inch, and cassette single
 "What Can I Do" (Mangini remix) – 4:04
 "What Can I Do" (original mix) – 4:21

Charts

Release history

References

143 Records singles
1997 songs
1998 singles
Atlantic Records singles
The Corrs songs
Lava Records singles
Songs written by Andrea Corr
Songs written by Caroline Corr
Songs written by Jim Corr
Songs written by Sharon Corr